The  (or the ) are an East Asian ethnic group comprising over 97% of the population of Japan.

It can also refer to the first people that settled in Yamato Province (modern-day Nara Prefecture). Generations of Japanese historians, linguists, and archeologists have debated whether the word is related to the earlier . The Yamato clan set up Japan's first and only dynasty. The clan became the ruling faction in the area, and incorporated native Japanese, Chinese and Korean migrants. The clan leaders also elevated their own belief system that featured ancestor worship into a national religion known as Shinto.

The term came to be used around the late 19th century to distinguish the settlers of mainland Japan from minority ethnic groups inhabiting the peripheral areas of the then Japanese Empire, including the Ainu, Emishi, Ryukyuans, Nivkh, Oroks, as well as Chinese, Koreans, Austronesians, and Micronesian peoples who were incorporated into the Empire of Japan in the early 20th century. After Japan's surrender in World War II, the term became antiquated for suggesting pseudoscientific racial notions that have been discarded in many circles. Japanese statistics only count their population in terms of nationality, rather than ethnicity.

Etymology

The Wajin (also known as Wa or Wō) or Yamato were the names early China used to refer to an ethnic group living in Japan around the time of the Three Kingdoms period. Chinese, Japanese, and Korean scribes regularly wrote Wa or Yamato with one and the same Chinese character 倭 until the 8th century, when the Japanese found fault with it, replacing it with 和 "harmony, peace, balance". Retroactively, this character was adopted in Japan to refer to the country itself, often combined with the character 大, literally meaning "Great", similar to Great Qing or Great Britain, so as to write the preexisting name Yamato (大和) (e.g., such as 大淸帝國 "Great Qing Empire" or 大英帝國 "Great British Empire"). The pronunciation Yamato cannot be formed from the sounds of its constituent Chinese characters; it is speculated to originally refer to a place in Japan meaning "Mountain Gate" (山戸).

The historical province of Yamato within Japan (now Nara Prefecture in central Honshu) borders Yamashiro Province (now the southern part of Kyoto Prefecture); however, the names of both provinces appear to contain the Japonic etymon yama, usually meaning "mountain(s)" (but sometimes having a meaning closer to "forest", especially in some Ryukyuan languages). Some other pairs of historical provinces of Japan exhibit similar sharing of one etymological element, such as Kazusa (<*Kami-tu-Fusa, "Upper Fusa") and Shimōsa (<*Simo-tu-Fusa, "Lower Fusa") or Kōzuke (<*Kami-tu-Ke, "Upper Ke") and Shimotsuke (<*Simo-tu-Ke, "Lower Ke"). In these latter cases, the pairs of provinces with similar names are thought to have been created through the subdivision of an earlier single province in prehistoric or protohistoric times.

Although the etymological origins of Wa remain uncertain, Chinese historical texts recorded an ancient people residing in the Japanese archipelago, named something like *ʼWâ or *ʼWər 倭. Carr surveys prevalent proposals for the etymology of Wa ranging from feasible (transcribing Japanese first-person pronouns waga 我が "my; our" and ware 我 "I; we; oneself") to shameful (writing Japanese Wa as 倭 implying "dwarf"), and summarizes interpretations for *ʼWâ "Japanese" into variations on two etymologies: "behaviorally 'submissive' or physically 'short. The first "submissive; obedient" explanation began with the (121 CE) Shuowen Jiezi dictionary. It defines 倭 as shùnmào 順皃 "obedient/submissive/docile appearance", graphically explains the "person; human' radical with a wěi 委 "bent" phonetic, and quotes the above Shi Jing poem. "Conceivably, when Chinese first met Japanese," Carr suggests, "they transcribed Wa as *ʼWâ 'bent back' signifying 'compliant' bowing/obeisance. Bowing is noted in early historical references to Japan." Examples include "Respect is shown by squatting", and "they either squat or kneel, with both hands on the ground. This is the way they show respect."

Koji Nakayama interprets wēi 逶 "winding" as "very far away" and euphemistically translates Wō 倭 as "separated from the continent". The second etymology of wō 倭 meaning "dwarf (variety of an animal or plant species), midget, little people" has possible cognates in ǎi 矮 "low, short (of stature)", wō 踒 "strain; sprain; bent legs", and wò 臥 "lie down; crouch; sit (animals and birds)". Early Chinese dynastic histories refer to a Zhūrúguó 侏儒國 "pygmy/dwarf country" located south of Japan, associated with possibly Okinawa Island or the Ryukyu Islands. Carr cites the historical precedence of construing Wa as "submissive people" and the "Country of Dwarfs" legend as evidence that the "little people" etymology was a secondary development.

History of usage

In the 6th century, the Yamato dynasty—one of many tribes, of various origins, who had settled Japan in prehistory—founded a state modeled on the Chinese states of Sui and Tang, the center of East Asian political influence at the time. As the Yamato influence expanded, their Old Japanese language became the common spoken language.

After Meiji restoration
Scientific racism was a Western idea that was imported from the late nineteenth century onward. Despite being hotly contested by Japanese scholars, the false notion of racial homogeneity was used as propaganda because of the political circumstances of late nineteenth- and early twentieth-century Japan, which coincided with Japanese imperialism and World War II. Pseudoscientific racial theories, which included the false belief of the superiority of the Yamato character, were used to justify military expansionism, discriminatory practices, and ethnocentrism. The concept of "pure blood" as a criterion for the uniqueness of the Yamato minzoku began circulating around 1880 in Japan, around the time some Japanese scientists began investigations into eugenics.

Initially, in order to justify Japan's conquest of Asia, Japanese propaganda espoused the ideas of Japanese supremacy by claiming that the Japanese represented a combination of all Asian peoples and cultures, emphasizing heterogeneous traits. Japanese propaganda started to place an emphasis on the ideas of racial purity and the supremacy of the Yamato race when the Second Sino-Japanese War intensified. Driven by the ideology of racial supremacy, racial purity and national unity, between 1868 and the 1940s, the Japanese government carefully identified and forcefully assimilated marginalized populations, which included Okinawans, the Ainu, and other underrepresented groups, imposing assimilation programs in language, culture and religion.

According to Aya Fujiwara, a postdoctoral Fellow at McMaster University, in an attempt to have some influence over the Japanese diaspora in Canada, Japanese authorities used the term Yamato as race propaganda during World War 2, saying that: "For Japanese-Canadians in particular, the Emperor was the most natural symbol to promote primordial national sentiment and superiority of the Yamato race — the term that the Japanese used to distinguish themselves from others. This term meant a noble race, the members of which saw themselves as “chosen people.” The modernization of Japan, which began with the Meiji Restoration in 1868, produced a number of historical writings that tried to define the Japanese under the official scheme to create a strong nation. Imported to Canada by Japanese intellectuals, a “common myth of descent” that Japanese people belonged to the noble Yamato race headed by the Emperor since the ancient period was one of the core elements that defined Japanese-Canadian ethno-racial identity in the 1920s and the 1930s. The evolution and survival of an ethnic community, Anthony D. Smith argues, relies on the complicated “belief-system” that creates “a sacred communion of the people” with cultural and historical distinctiveness. During this period, Japanese intellectuals, scholars, and official representatives sought to keep Japanese Canadians within their sphere of influence, thereby reinforcing a transnational myth that would promote Japanese Canadians’ sense of racial pride as God’s chosen people in the world."

Contemporary usage
At the end of the World War II, the Japanese government continued to adhere to the notions of racial homogeneity and racial supremacy, with the Yamato race at the top of the racial hierarchy. Japanese propaganda of racial purity returned to post-World War II Japan because of the support of the Allied forces. U.S. policy in Japan terminated the purge of high-ranking fascist war criminals and reinstalled the leaders who were responsible for the creation and manifestation of prewar race propaganda.

In present-day Japan, the term Yamato minzoku may be seen as antiquated for connoting racial notions that have been discarded in many circles since Japan's surrender in World War II. "Japanese people" or even "Japanese-Japanese" are often used instead, although these terms also have complications owing to their ambiguous blending of notions of ethnicity and nationality.

In present-day Japan statistics only counts their population in terms of nationality, rather than ethnicity, thus the number of ethnic Yamato and their actual population numbers are ambiguous.

Origin 

The most well-regarded theory is that present-day Yamato Japanese are descendants from both the Yayoi people and the various local Jōmon people. Japanese people belong to the East Asian lineages D-M55 and O-M175, with a minority belonging to C-M217 and N-M231. The reference population for the Japanese (Yamato) used in Geno 2.0 Next Generation is 89% East Asia, 2% Finland and Northern Siberia, 2% Central Asia, and 7% Southeast Asia & Oceania, making Japanese approximately ~100% East-Eurasian. Genealogical research has indicated extremely similar genetic profiles between these groups, making them nearly indistinguishable from each other and ancient samples. Japanese people were found to share high genetic affinity with the ancient (~8,000 BC) "Devils_Gate_N" sample in the Amur region of Northeast Asia.

The earliest written records about people in Japan are from Chinese sources. These sources spoke about the Wa people, the direct ancestors of the Yamato and other Japonic agriculturalists. The Wa of Na received a golden seal from the Emperor Guangwu of the Later Han dynasty. This event was recorded in the Book of the Later Han compiled by Fan Ye in the 5th century. The seal itself was discovered in northern Kyūshū in the 18th century. Early Chinese historians described Wa as a land of hundreds of scattered tribal communities. Third-century Chinese sources reported that the Wa/early Yamato lived on raw fish, vegetables, and rice served on bamboo and wooden trays, clapped their hands in worship (something still done in Shinto shrines today), and built earthen-grave mounds. They also maintained vassal-master relations, collected taxes, had provincial granaries and markets, and observed mourning. The Wei Zhi, which is part of the Records of the three Kingdoms, first mentions Yamataikoku and Queen Himiko in the 3rd century. According to the record, Himiko assumed the throne of Wa, as a spiritual leader, after a major civil war. Her younger brother was in charge of the affairs of state, including diplomatic relations with the Chinese court of the Kingdom of Wei. When asked about their origins by the Wei embassy, the people of Wa claimed to be descendants of the people of Wu, a historic figure of the Wu Kingdom around the Yangtze Delta of China, however this is disputed.

Japonic speakers were also present on the southern and central "Korean Peninsula". These "Peninsular Japonic agriculturalists" were later replaced/assimilated by Koreanic-speakers (from southern Manchuria) likely causing the Yayoi migration and expansion within the Japanese archipelago. Whitman (2012) suggests that the Yayoi agriculturalists are not related to the proto-Koreans but that they were present on the Korean peninsula during the Mumun pottery period. According to him, Japonic arrived in the Korean peninsula around 1500 BC and was brought to the Japanese archipelago by the Yayoi agriculturalists at around 950 BC, during the late Jōmon period. The language family associated with both Mumun and Yayoi culture is Japonic. Koreanic arrived later from Manchuria to the Korean peninsula at around 300 BC and coexist with the descendants of the Japonic Mumun cultivators (or assimilated them). Both had influence on each other and a later founder effect diminished the internal variety of both language families.

A genetic study (2019) estimated that modern Japanese (Yamato) share more than 90% of their genome with the Yayoi rice agriculturalists and less than 10% with the heterogeneous Jōmon period groups. A more recent study by Gakuhari et al. 2019 estimates that modern Japanese people have between 92% to 96,7% Yayoi rice-agriculturalist ancestry (with the 3.3% to 8% from the heterogeneous Jōmon period tribes) and cluster closely with other Koreans and Han-Chinese, but are slightly with shifted towards eastern Siberians.

Based on archaeological evidence and the genetic similarity between modern Japanese and Koreans, Jared Diamond said that the Yayoi people, the ancestors of the Yamato people, migrated from the Korean peninsula.
Watanabe et al. 2021 found that the Jōmon people were a heterogeneous population and that Japanese from different regions had different amounts of Jōmon-derived SNP alleles, ranging from 17.3% to 24% samplified by southern Jōmon, and 3.8% to 14.9% samplified by northern Jōmon. Southern Jōmon were genetically similar to contemporary East Asians (especially Tujia people, Tibetan people and Miao people), while northern Jōmon had a partial distinct ancestry component, possibly deriving from Paleolithic Siberians, next to an East Asian ancestry component. The Jōmon period population, although heterogeneous, were closest to contemporary East Asians and Native Americans.

In 2021, new research from a study published in the journal Science Advances found that the people of Japan bore genetic signatures from three ancient populations rather than just two as previously thought.

The first was Japan's indigenous culture of hunter-gatherers called the Jomon, dating to roughly 15,000 years ago. The second was a population of Northeast Asian origins called the Yayoi, who arrived at about 900 BC, bringing wet-rice farming to Japan. According to the researchers, Japanese people has approximately 13% and 16% genetic ancestry from these two groups respectively.

The remaining 71% of genetic ancestry was found to come from migrants that arrived around 300 AD during the Kofun period, and had genetic makeup mainly resembling the Han Chinese population of China. This migrant group was said to have brought cultural advances and centralised leadership to Japan. According to Shigeki Nakagome, co-leader of the study, "Chinese characters started to be used in this period, such as Chinese characters inscribed on metal implements, for example swords."

A new study in 2022 conducted by the University of Xiamen shed light on the lack of Jōmon genomes found in present-day Koreans and Japanese. Researchers discovered that despite finding evidence of the Jōmon people on the Korean peninsula and the Japanese archipelago, there were little to no traces left of their genetic impact in their respective people's gene pools. According to the study, Ancient Koreans were composed of "northern East Asian-related ancestry and indigenous Jōmon-related ancestry" where the "northern East Asian ancestry was suggested to be related to the Neolithic West Liao River farmers in northeast China". The finding indicated that the "West Liao River-related farmers might have spread the proto-Korean language as their ancestry was found to be predominant in extant Koreans" and these "Proto-Korean groups, in turn, introduced West Liao River-like ancestry into the gene pool of present-day Japan". These people are thought to have caused the displacement of the indigenous Jōmon people causing a significant diminishment of Jōmon genomes in the regions. It was deduced that this event (and the populations remaining genetically homogeneous since then) was what caused modern Koreans and Japanese to share the majority of their genetic makeup as the latter group "can be represented as a mixture of Koreans (91%) with a limited genetic heritage from a basal East Asian lineage related to Jōmon (9%)".

Controversies regarding the Ryukyuan people 

Major disagreements exists as to whether the Ryukyuans are considered the same as the Yamato, or identified as an independent but related ethnic group, or as a sub-group that constitutes Japanese ethnicity together with the Yamato. Ryukyuans have a distinct culture from the Yamato, with its own native cuisine, history, language, religion and traditions.

From the Meiji period onward, by which the Ryukyuan's kingdom was annexed by Japan, Japanese scholars such as Shinobu Orikuchi and Kunio Yanagita supported the later discredited ideological viewpoint that they were a sub-group of the Yamato people. The Ryukyuans were forcibly assimilated into Japanese (Yamato) people with their ethnic identity suppressed by the Meiji government, and suppressed Ryukyuan ethnic identity, tradition, culture and language. Many modern day Japanese people today that colonized the Ryukyu Islands are a mixture of both Yamato and Ryukyuan.

See also

 Emperor of Japan
 Ethnic groups of Japan
 Japanese battleship Yamato
 Japanese nationalism
 Nihonjinron
 Race and ethnicity in Japan
 Yama-bito
 Yamato (disambiguation)
 Yamato period
 Yamato nadeshiko
 Yamato-damashii—"the Japanese spirit"

References

 
Demographics of Japan
Ethnic groups in Japan